Family Guy: Live in Vegas is a soundtrack album for the American animated television series Family Guy. It was released on April 26, 2005 by Geffen Records. It was composed by Walter Murphy and creator Seth MacFarlane. The album features only one song from the series: the theme song; the rest of the songs were composed exclusively for the album. It features vocals from Seth MacFarlane, Alex Borstein, Seth Green, Mike Henry, Mila Kunis, Adam West and Lori Alan, as well as Jason Alexander, Patti LuPone and Haylie Duff as guest stars. It includes Rat Pack- and Broadway-inspired songs.

The album also came with a DVD featuring the music video for Stewie's "Sexy Party" as well as "making-of" featurettes for the album and the video.

The album was nominated for the Grammy Award for Best Comedy Album at the 48th Grammy Awards, but it lost to Chris Rock's Never Scared.

Background
Seth MacFarlane described the album as "a blend of the rich, lush arrangements of the classic era of Rat Pack Vegas shows combined with the fart jokes of today". MacFarlane co-produced the album and co-wrote several tracks. It features guest stars Jason Alexander, Patti LuPone and Haylie Duff. The album includes a cover of "The Last Time I Saw Paris" by Jerome Kern as well as a medley of theme songs from 1980s shows such as Diff'rent Strokes, Who's the Boss, Growing Pains and Charles in Charge. The album is arranged and orchestrated by Walter Murphy and all songs are produced by MacFarlane and Murphy.

All the voice actors from the show appear on the album voicing their characters. The album includes a DVD with the music video of Stewie's "Sexy Party" and behind the scenes segments on making the album and the video. The DVD also includes a trailer for American Dad! and the fourth season of Family Guy.

Track listing

Reception

The album received positive reviews from music sources and critics. Rob Theakston of AllMusic said that "[Family Guy is] back and raunchier than ever, sparing no expense and leaving no pop culture stone unturned" and "without the constraints of network censors, the profanity and heat are turned up to the max". He called the Broadway-inspired music "brilliant yet jarring juxtaposition of raunch and class". The DVD was called a "must-have for any fan of the show". Tina Huang of Soundtrack.Net said that the album "wonderfully merges the flair of big-band orchestras, with simulated, on-stage, Rat Pack-like performances, a chorus, and convincing live audience" and called it "mainly for fans; it can't be argued that the music is no less than impressive, but the messages may offend".

Charts

See also

References

Live in Vegas
Television animation soundtracks
2005 soundtrack albums
Seth MacFarlane albums
2000s comedy albums
Geffen Records albums